Uudet kymmenen käskyä is the second album by Finnish thrash metal band Stam1na. It was released on 10 May 2006, and reached No. 3 on the Finnish albums chart. On 10 March 2007, the album was chosen as the Metal Album of 2006 at the Emma Awards, arranged by the Finnish recording industry.

The single, "Likainen parketti", went to No. 1 on the Finnish singles chart. Another song, Edessäni, was released as an Internet-only digi-single.

Track listing
 Uudet kymmenen käskyä (4:42) "The New Ten Commandments"
 Merestä maalle (4:01) "From Ocean To Land"
 Edessäni (4:11) "In Front Of Me"
 Viisi laukausta päähän (3:53) "Five Shots To The Head"
 Vapaa maa (4:43) "Free Nation"
 Lapsus (3:48) "Lapse"
 Paperinukke (4:02) "Paper Doll"
 Suhdeluku (3:42) "Ratio / Affair Count"
 Likainen parketti (4:48) "Dirty/Messy Parquet"
 Ovi (4:43) "The Door"
 Kaksi reittiä yksi suunta (5:23) "Two Routes One Direction"

Personnel 

 Antti Hyyrynen – vocals, backing vocals, guitar
 Kai-Pekka Kangasmäki – bass, backing vocals
 Pekka Olkkonen – lead guitar
 Teppo Velin – drums

Additional musicians 

 Sami Kujala – backing vocals
 Emil Lähteenmäki – keyboards
 Jouni Hynynen, Kaarle Viikate, Rainer Nygård, Tuomo Saikkonen – additional vocals on track 4

Technical 

 Miitri Aaltonen – producer, engineer, mixing, vocal arrangements
 Mika Jussila – mastering
 Ville Hyyrynen – artwork

References

External links 
 Official Stam1na website
 Uudet Kymmenen Käskyä on the Finnish album charts

Stam1na albums
2006 albums